Euriphene intermixta is a butterfly in the family Nymphalidae. It is found in the Democratic Republic of the Congo (Uele, Ituri, north Kivu, Tshopo, Sankuru and Maniema).

References

Butterflies described in 1904
Euriphene
Endemic fauna of the Democratic Republic of the Congo
Butterflies of Africa